The following is a list of teams and cyclists that took part in the 2020 Tour de France. Each of the 22 teams started with eight riders, for a total of 176 participants.

Teams
The 19 UCI WorldTeams were automatically invited to the race. Additionally, the organisers of the Tour, the Amaury Sport Organisation (ASO), invited three second-tier UCI ProTeams to participate in the event. Two of the three French teams have participated in the race before, while  made their Tour de France debut.

The teams that participated in the race were:

UCI WorldTeams

 
 
 
 
 
 
 
 
 
 
 
 
 
 
 
 
 
 
 

UCI ProTeams

Cyclists

By starting number

By team

By nationality 
The 176 riders that are competing in the 2020 Tour de France originated from 30 different countries.

References

2020 Tour de France
2020